Butler Chapel African Methodist Episcopal Zion Church is a historic church at 1002 N. Church Street in Tuskegee, Alabama.  Built in 1957, it was added to the Alabama Register of Landmarks and Heritage in 1985 and the National Register of Historic Places in 1995. It was an important location associated with the civil rights movement of the 1950s and '60s.

The church was founded by Rev. John M. Butler in late 1865. There were at least two earlier church buildings, built in 1867 and 1887, respectively. A shanty on the grounds of the church was the birthplace of Tuskegee Normal School, now Tuskegee University, on July 4, 1881.

References

African Methodist Episcopal Zion churches in Alabama
Churches on the National Register of Historic Places in Alabama
National Register of Historic Places in Macon County, Alabama
Gothic Revival church buildings in Alabama
Churches completed in 1957
Churches in Macon County, Alabama
Properties on the Alabama Register of Landmarks and Heritage